The 1988–89 NBA season was the Jazz's 15th season in the National Basketball Association, and 10th season in Salt Lake City, Utah. During the off-season, the Jazz acquired Mike Brown from the expansion Charlotte Hornets. This season marked the arrival of assistant coach Jerry Sloan, who became a full-time head coach replacing Frank Layden, who retired from coaching after an 11–6 start to the season. Sloan would go on to coach the Jazz for 23 seasons, including two trips to the Finals in 1997 and 1998, and 19 playoff appearances out of 22 seasons, including 15 consecutive appearances from 1989 to 2003, and 4 more from 2007 to 2010 before he resigned midway through the 2010–11 season. The Jazz held a 28–20 record at the All-Star break, and finished first in the Midwest Division with a 51–31 record.

Karl Malone averaged 29.1 points, 10.7 rebounds and 1.8 steals per game, and was named to the All-NBA First Team, while sixth man Thurl Bailey averaged 19.5 points and 5.5 rebounds per game off the bench, and John Stockton provided the team with 17.1 points, 13.2 assists and 3.2 steals per game, and was named to the All-NBA Second Team and NBA All-Defensive Second Team. In addition, Darrell Griffith contributed 13.8 points per game, and Mark Eaton provided with 6.2 points, 10.3 rebounds and 3.8 blocks per game, and was named Defensive Player of the Year, while being selected to the NBA All-Defensive First Team.

Malone, Stockton and Eaton were all selected for the 1989 NBA All-Star Game, which was Stockton's first All-Star appearance, and where Malone won the All-Star Game MVP award. Malone also finished in third place in Most Valuable Player voting, while Stockton finished in seventh place, and Bailey finished in second place in Sixth Man of the Year voting.

However, in the Western Conference First Round of the playoffs, the Jazz were swept by the 7th-seeded Golden State Warriors in three straight games. The Jazz sold 10,153 season tickets, which was an increase of 550 from the previous season.

Draft picks

Roster

Regular season

Season standings

Record vs. opponents

Game log

Regular season

|- align="center" bgcolor="#ffcccc"
| 1
| November 4
| Seattle
|
|
|
|
| Salt Palace
| 0–1
|- align="center" bgcolor="#ccffcc"
| 2
| November 9
| Sacramento
|
|
|
|
| Salt Palace
| 1–1
|- align="center" bgcolor="#ffcccc"
| 3
| November 10
| @ Houston
|
|
|
|
| The Summit
| 1–2
|- align="center" bgcolor="#ccffcc"
| 4
| November 12
| @ San Antonio
|
|
|
|
| HemisFair Arena
| 2–2
|- align="center" bgcolor="#ccffcc"
| 5
| November 15
| Indiana
|
|
|
|
| Salt Palace
| 3–2
|- align="center" bgcolor="#ccffcc"
| 6
| November 17
| Portland
|
|
|
|
| Salt Palace
| 4–2
|- align="center" bgcolor="#ccffcc"
| 7
| November 19
| Phoenix
|
|
|
|
| Salt Palace
| 5–2
|- align="center" bgcolor="#ccffcc"
| 8
| November 21
| L.A. Clippers
|
|
|
|
| Salt Palace
| 6–2
|- align="center" bgcolor="#ccffcc"
| 9
| November 23
| Houston
|
|
|
|
| Salt Palace
| 7–2
|- align="center" bgcolor="#ccffcc"
| 10
| November 25
| San Antonio
|
|
|
|
| Salt Palace
| 8–2
|- align="center" bgcolor="#ffcccc"
| 11
| November 26
| @ Dallas
|
|
|
|
| Reunion Arena
| 8–3
|- align="center" bgcolor="#ffcccc"
| 12
| November 29
| @ Seattle
|
|
|
|
| Seattle Center Coliseum
| 8–4
|- align="center" bgcolor="#ccffcc"
| 13
| November 30
| Chicago
|
|
|
|
| Salt Palace
| 9–4

|- align="center" bgcolor="#ffcccc"
| 14
| December 2
| @ L.A. Lakers
|
|
|
|
| The Forum
| 9–5
|- align="center" bgcolor="#ccffcc"
| 15
| December 3
| @ Sacramento
|
|
|
|
| ARCO Arena
| 10–5
|- align="center" bgcolor="#ffcccc"
| 16
| December 6
| @ Golden State
|
|
|
|
| Oakland–Alameda County Coliseum Arena
| 10–6
|- align="center" bgcolor="#ccffcc"
| 17
| December 7
| Washington
|
|
|
|
| Salt Palace
| 11–6
|- align="center" bgcolor="#ffcccc"
| 18
| December 9
| Dallas
|
|
|
|
| Salt Palace
| 11–7
|- align="center" bgcolor="#ccffcc"
| 19
| December 10
| @ L.A. Clippers
|
|
|
|
| Los Angeles Memorial Sports Arena
| 12–7
|- align="center" bgcolor="#ccffcc"
| 20
| December 12
| Miami
|
|
|
|
| Salt Palace
| 13–7
|- align="center" bgcolor="#ffcccc"
| 21
| December 14
| @ Boston
|
|
|
|
| Boston Garden
| 13–8
|- align="center" bgcolor="#ffcccc"
| 22
| December 15
| @ New York
|
|
|
|
| Madison Square Garden
| 13–9
|- align="center" bgcolor="#ffcccc"
| 23
| December 17
| @ Philadelphia
|
|
|
|
| The Spectrum
| 13–10
|- align="center" bgcolor="#ffcccc"
| 24
| December 20
| @ Cleveland
|
|
|
|
| Richfield Coliseum
| 13–11
|- align="center" bgcolor="#ccffcc"
| 25
| December 21
| @ Washington
|
|
|
|
| Capital Centre
| 14–11
|- align="center" bgcolor="#ffcccc"
| 26
| December 23
| @ Miami
|
|
|
|
| Miami Arena
| 14–12
|- align="center" bgcolor="#ccffcc"
| 27
| December 25
| L.A. Lakers
|
|
|
|
| Salt Palace
| 15–12
|- align="center" bgcolor="#ccffcc"
| 28
| December 28
| Sacramento
|
|
|
|
| Salt Palace
| 16–12
|- align="center" bgcolor="#ccffcc"
| 29
| December 30
| Philadelphia
|
|
|
|
| Salt Palace
| 17–12

|- align="center" bgcolor="#ffcccc"
| 30
| January 3
| @ Houston
|
|
|
|
| The Summit
| 17–13
|- align="center" bgcolor="#ccffcc"
| 31
| January 6
| @ Chicago
|
|
|
|
| Chicago Stadium
| 18–13
|- align="center" bgcolor="#ffcccc"
| 32
| January 7
| @ Milwaukee
|
|
|
|
| Bradley Center
| 18–14
|- align="center" bgcolor="#ccffcc"
| 33
| January 9
| @ Charlotte
|
|
|
|
| Charlotte Coliseum
| 19–14
|- align="center" bgcolor="#ccffcc"
| 34
| January 10
| @ Miami
|
|
|
|
| Miami Arena
| 20–14
|- align="center" bgcolor="#ccffcc"
| 35
| January 12
| San Antonio
|
|
|
|
| Salt Palace
| 21–14
|- align="center" bgcolor="#ffcccc"
| 36
| January 14
| @ Golden State
|
|
|
|
| Oakland–Alameda County Coliseum Arena
| 21–15
|- align="center" bgcolor="#ccffcc"
| 37
| January 17
| @ Portland
|
|
|
|
| Memorial Coliseum
| 22–15
|- align="center" bgcolor="#ccffcc"
| 38
| January 20
| Milwaukee
|
|
|
|
| Salt Palace
| 23–15
|- align="center" bgcolor="#ccffcc"
| 39
| January 25
| @ San Antonio
|
|
|
|
| HemisFair Arena
| 24–15
|- align="center" bgcolor="#ffcccc"
| 40
| January 26
| Charlotte
|
|
|
|
| Salt Palace
| 24–16
|- align="center" bgcolor="#ccffcc"
| 41
| January 28
| New York
|
|
|
|
| Salt Palace
| 25–16
|- align="center" bgcolor="#ccffcc"
| 42
| January 31
| @ Dallas
|
|
|
|
| Reunion Arena
| 26–16

|- align="center" bgcolor="#ffcccc"
| 43
| February 1
| Atlanta
|
|
|
|
| Salt Palace
| 26–17
|- align="center" bgcolor="#ccffcc"
| 44
| February 3
| New Jersey
|
|
|
|
| Salt Palace
| 27–17
|- align="center" bgcolor="#ffcccc"
| 45
| February 4
| @ Denver
|
|
|
|
| McNichols Sports Arena
| 27–18
|- align="center" bgcolor="#ffcccc"
| 46
| February 6
| @ Phoenix
|
|
|
|
| Arizona Veterans Memorial Coliseum
| 27–19
|- align="center" bgcolor="#ccffcc"
| 47
| February 7
| Miami
|
|
|
|
| Salt Palace
| 28–19
|- align="center" bgcolor="#ffcccc"
| 48
| February 9
| Dallas
|
|
|
|
| Salt Palace
| 28–20
|- align="center" bgcolor="#ccffcc"
| 49
| February 14
| Denver
|
|
|
|
| Salt Palace
| 29–20
|- align="center" bgcolor="#ccffcc"
| 50
| February 16
| Boston
|
|
|
|
| Salt Palace
| 30–20
|- align="center" bgcolor="#ccffcc"
| 51
| February 18
| San Antonio
|
|
|
|
| Salt Palace
| 31–20
|- align="center" bgcolor="#ccffcc"
| 52
| February 20
| Phoenix
|
|
|
|
| Salt Palace
| 32–20
|- align="center" bgcolor="#ccffcc"
| 53
| February 22
| L.A. Lakers
|
|
|
|
| Salt Palace
| 33–20
|- align="center" bgcolor="#ffcccc"
| 54
| February 24
| @ Denver
|
|
|
|
| McNichols Sports Arena
| 33–21
|- align="center" bgcolor="#ffcccc"
| 55
| February 26
| @ Indiana
|
|
|
|
| Market Square Arena
| 33–22
|- align="center" bgcolor="#ccffcc"
| 56
| February 27
| @ New Jersey
|
|
|
|
| Miami Arena
| 34–22

|- align="center" bgcolor="#ffcccc"
| 57
| March 1
| @ Detroit
|
|
|
|
| Palace of Auburn Hills
| 34–23
|- align="center" bgcolor="#ccffcc"
| 58
| March 3
| @ Miami
|
|
|
|
| Miami Arena
| 35–23
|- align="center" bgcolor="#ccffcc"
| 59
| March 5
| @ Atlanta
|
|
|
|
| The Omni
| 36–23
|- align="center" bgcolor="#ccffcc"
| 60
| March 8
| Houston
|
|
|
|
| Salt Palace
| 37–23
|- align="center" bgcolor="#ccffcc"
| 61
| March 10
| Golden State
|
|
|
|
| Salt Palace
| 38–23
|- align="center" bgcolor="#ccffcc"
| 62
| March 13
| Cleveland
|
|
|
|
| Salt Palace
| 39–23
|- align="center" bgcolor="#ccffcc"
| 63
| March 15
| Portland
|
|
|
|
| Salt Palace
| 40–23
|- align="center" bgcolor="#ccffcc"
| 64
| March 17
| Miami
|
|
|
|
| Salt Palace
| 41–23
|- align="center" bgcolor="#ffcccc"
| 65
| March 18
| @ San Antonio
|
|
|
|
| HemisFair Arena
| 41–24
|- align="center" bgcolor="#ffcccc"
| 66
| March 21
| @ Seattle
|
|
|
|
| Seattle Center Coliseum
| 41–25
|- align="center" bgcolor="#ccffcc"
| 67
| March 24
| @ Houston
|
|
|
|
| The Summit
| 42–25
|- align="center" bgcolor="#ccffcc"
| 68
| March 25
| Denver
|
|
|
|
| Salt Palace
| 43–25
|- align="center" bgcolor="#ccffcc"
| 69
| March 27
| Seattle
|
|
|
|
| Salt Palace
| 44–25
|- align="center" bgcolor="#ffcccc"
| 70
| March 29
| Detroit
|
|
|
|
| Salt Palace
| 44–26

|- align="center" bgcolor="#ffcccc"
| 71
| April 1
| @ Sacramento
|
|
|
|
| ARCO Arena
| 44–27
|- align="center" bgcolor="#ccffcc"
| 72
| April 4
| Dallas
|
|
|
|
| Salt Palace
| 45–27
|- align="center" bgcolor="#ffcccc"
| 73
| April 5
| @ Phoenix
|
|
|
|
| Arizona Veterans Memorial Coliseum
| 46–37
|- align="center" bgcolor="#ccffcc"
| 74
| April 7
| @ L.A. Lakers
|
|
|
|
| Great Western Forum
| 46–28
|- align="center" bgcolor="#ffcccc"
| 75
| April 8
| @ Denver
|
|
|
|
| McNichols Sports Arena
| 46–29
|- align="center" bgcolor="#ccffcc"
| 76
| April 12
| Denver
|
|
|
|
| Salt Palace
| 47–29
|- align="center" bgcolor="#ccffcc"
| 77
| April 14
| Houston
|
|
|
|
| Salt Palace
| 48–29
|- align="center" bgcolor="#ccffcc"
| 78
| April 15
| @ Portland
|
|
|
|
| Memorial Coliseum
| 49–29
|- align="center" bgcolor="#ccffcc"
| 79
| April 17
| @ L.A. Clippers
|
|
|
|
| Los Angeles Memorial Sports Arena
| 50–29
|- align="center" bgcolor="#ffcccc"
| 80
| April 18
| L.A. Clippers
|
|
|
|
| Salt Palace
| 50–30
|- align="center" bgcolor="#ffcccc"
| 81
| April 21
| @ Dallas
|
|
|
|
| Reunion Arena
| 50–31
|- align="center" bgcolor="#ccffcc"
| 82
| April 22
| Golden State
|
|
|
|
| Salt Palace
| 51–31

Playoffs

|- align="center" bgcolor="#ffcccc"
| 1
| April 27
| Golden State
| L 119–123
| John Stockton (30)
| Karl Malone (13)
| John Stockton (14)
| Salt Palace12,444
| 0–1
|- align="center" bgcolor="#ffcccc"
| 2
| April 29
| Golden State
| L 91–99
| Karl Malone (37)
| Karl Malone (22)
| John Stockton (11)
| Salt Palace12,444
| 0–2
|- align="center" bgcolor="#ffcccc"
| 3
| May 2
| @ Golden State
| L 106–120
| John Stockton (34)
| Karl Malone (14)
| John Stockton (16)
| Oakland–Alameda County Coliseum Arena15,025
| 0–3
|-

Player statistics

Season

|- align="center" bgcolor=""
| || 82 || 3 || 33.9 || .483 || .400 || .825 || 5.5 || 1.7 || 0.5 || 1.1 || 19.5
|- align="center" bgcolor="#f0f0f0"
| 
| 66 || 16 || 15.9 || .419 || .000 || .718 || 3.9 || 0.6 || 0.4 || 0.3 || 4.5
|- align="center" bgcolor=""
| 
| 82 || 82 || 35.5 || .462 || .000 || .660 || 10.3 || 1.0 || 0.5 || 3.8 || 6.2
|- align="center" bgcolor="#f0f0f0"
| 
| 37 || 0 || 11.1 || .401 || .450 || .707 || 1.5 || 0.8 || 0.2 || 0.0 || 4.1
|- align="center" bgcolor=""
| 
| 82 || 73 || 29.0 || .446 || .311 || .780 || 4.0 || 1.6 || 1.0 || 0.3 || 13.8
|- align="center" bgcolor="#f0f0f0"
| 
| 46 || 9 || 21.0 || .437 || .352 || .560 || 2.8 || 1.1 || 0.8 || 0.1 || 7.4
|- align="center" bgcolor=""
| 
| 77 || 50 || 10.3 || .442 || .000 || .818 || 1.7 || 0.4 || 0.1 || 0.2 || 2.3
|- align="center" bgcolor="#f0f0f0"
| 
| 19 || 0 || 9.3 || .364 || .000 || .545 || 0.6 || 1.1 || 0.5 || 0.0 || 1.6
|- align="center" bgcolor=""
| 
| 75 || 0 || 10.4 || .545 || .000 || .699 || 2.7 || 0.2 || 0.1 || 0.3 || 4.3
|- align="center" bgcolor="#f0f0f0"
| 
| 82 || 0 || 9.5 || .301 || .071 || .781 || 1.1 || 2.6 || 0.3 || 0.1 || 1.7
|- align="center" bgcolor=""
| 
| 80 || 80 || 39.1 || .519|| .313 || .766 || 10.7 || 2.7 || 1.8 || 0.9 || 29.1
|- align="center" bgcolor="#f0f0f0"
| 
| 51 || 15 || 6.4 || .440 || .000 || .596 || 1.1 || 0.2 || 0.2 || 0.1 || 2.8
|- align="center" bgcolor=""
| 
| 16 || 0 || 4.5 || .292 || .167 || .727 || 0.5 || 0.4 || 0.3 || 0.1 || 1.4
|- align="center" bgcolor="#f0f0f0"
| 
| 82 || 82 || 38.7 || .538 || .462 || .863 || 3.0 || 13.6 || 3.2 || 0.2 || 17.1
|- align="center" bgcolor=""
| 
| 1 || 0 || 2.0 || .000 || .000 || .000 || 0 || 0 || 0 || 0 || 0
|}

Playoffs

|- align="center" bgcolor=""
| 
| 3 || 2 || 40.7 || .353 || .000 || .800 || 8.3 || 1.0 || 0.3 || 1.3 || 12.0
|- align="center" bgcolor="#f0f0f0"
| 
| 2 || 1 || 5.5 || .000 || .000 || .000 || 1.0 || 0.0 || 0.0 || 0.0 || 0.0
|- align="center" bgcolor=""
| 
| 3 || 3 || 33.0 || .471 || .000 || .818 || 11.0 || 0.3 || 0.3 || 0.7 || 8.3
|- align="center" bgcolor="#f0f0f0"
| 
| 2 || 0 || 1.5 || .000 || .000 || .000 || 0.0 || 0.0 || 0.0 || 0.0 || 0.0
|- align="center" bgcolor=""
| 
| 3 || 0 || 23.7 || .408 || .316 || .000 || 4.0 || 0.0 || 1.3 || 0.3 || 15.3
|- align="center" bgcolor="#f0f0f0"
| 
| 3 || 3 || 41.0 || .314 || .333 || .800 || 5.7 || 1.3 || 0.3 || 0.7 || 11.0
|- align="center" bgcolor=""
| 
| 1 || 0 || 1.0 || .000 || .000 || .000 || 0.0 || 0.0 || 0.0 || 0.0 || 0.0
|- align="center" bgcolor="#f0f0f0"
| 
| 3 || 0 || 3.3 || .250 || .000 || .000 || 0.7 || 0.0 || 0.0 || 0.0 || 0.7
|- align="center" bgcolor=""
| 
| 3 || 0 || 1.7 || .000 || .000 || .000 || 0.0 || 0.7 || 0.0 || 0.0 || 0.0
|- align="center" bgcolor="#f0f0f0"
| 
| 3 || 3 || 45.3 || .500 || .000 || .813 || 16.3 || 1.3 || 1.0 || 0.3 || 30.7
|- align="center" bgcolor=""
| 
| 3 || 3 || 46.3 || .508 || .750 || .905 || 3.3 || 13.7 || 3.7 || 1.7 || 27.3
|}

Awards and records
Mark Eaton, NBA Defensive Player of the Year Award
Karl Malone, All-NBA First Team
John Stockton, All-NBA Second Team
Mark Eaton, NBA All-Defensive First Team
John Stockton, NBA All-Defensive Second Team

Transactions

References

Utah Jazz seasons
Utah
Utah Jazz
Utah Jazz